Classified under the Mamean branch family of languages, Tektitek (also known as Tectiteco, Teco, Teko, Kʼontiʼl, Qyool, among others) is a Mayan language spoken by the Tektitan people of Huehuetenango, Guatemala. It is very closely related to the Mam language. A number of Tektitek speakers have settled in Mexico. Due to the close proximity of Huehuetenango to the Mexican border the speakers of the language have appropriated aspects of Mexican Spanish into the language. While 4,900 speakers were recorded in 2010 by Ethnologue, Juventino de Jesus Perez Alonzo estimated that there were just 2,000 speakers of the language left at that time. He noted however, that measures are being taken to teach the children in Huehuetenango the Tekitek language. According to the Endangered Languages Project, the language is currently threatened. Little is known about the culture, but there are resources that provide vocabulary as well as other educational tools.

Culture 
Little is known about Tektitan peoples and their cultures. Linguist, Perez Alonzo, says much work is being done to improve this. YouTube has a video about farming in the Teco lands, as well as Tektitekan clay pots. In the farming video, a speaker of Teco explains that the best time to sow corn is during full moons, because if sown afterwards, the corn is not as good, as it tends to break apart. The speaker continues that the day after the harvest, families are invited to celebrate, a lamb is killed, and it is shared amongst everyone along with the corn. They light fireworks and extend to each family five corn cobs each, and everyone goes on enjoying the celebration. In the clay pots video, another native speaker, this one a woman, explains the process of clay pot making.

Education 
As part of the effort to reestablish the Tektitek language, Ernesto Baltazar Gutierrez, a Guatemalan author, released a Tektiteko Grammar book in 2007 and in the same year, also collaborated with author, Erico Simon Morales, to release a Tektiteko bilingual dictionary that is used in schools in Guatemala. Rutgers University is home to one of the copies of the vocabulary books. Some websites are also being changed towards helping individuals learn some Tektiteko vocabulary words and prayers, such as one ran by the Native Languages of the Americas Foundation.

Vocabulary 
The table below provides a list of English words and their Tektitek counterparts, as found on the Native Languages of Americas page. A detailed account of pronunciations are also found on this site.

Phonology

The coronal ejectives ( may be allophonically pre-voiced.

Other sources 
Sources include Paul Stevenson's grammar and idioms book in 1986 and 1987, and Terrence Kaufman's book on the language titled, "Teco - A New Mayan Language" written in 1969. Margaret Wendell also wrote a book on the Alphabet system of Tektitek.

References 

Mayan languages
Agglutinative languages
Indigenous languages of Central America
Mesoamerican languages
Languages of Guatemala
Huehuetenango Department